The Somali Disaster Management Agency (SoDMA) .Wasaaradda Gargaarka iyo Maareynta Musiibooyinka: is the national emergency management agency of the Federal Republic of Somalia.

Overview
On August  3, 2011, the Federal Government of Somalia announced that the Cabinet had approved draft legislation on a new Somali Disaster Management Agency (SoDMA), which had originally been proposed by the Ministry of Interior. According to the Prime Minister's Media Office, the SoDMA will lead and coordinate the government's response to various natural disasters. It is part of a broader effort by the federal authorities to re-establish national institutions. February 14, 2016 Federal Parliament is now approved the proposed bill for endorsement.

References

Emergency management in Somalia
Government agencies established in 2013
Government of Somalia